Hugh Brown may refer to:

Sports
 Hugh Brown (golfer) (c. 1850–?), Scottish golfer
 Hugh Brown (boxer) (1894–1935), British boxer
 Hugh Brown (Queen's Park footballer), Scottish footballer who made one appearance for Queen's Park in 1915
 Hugh Brown (sportswriter) (c. 1906–1985), British-born American sportswriter
 Hugh Brown (footballer, born 1921) (1921–1994), Scottish footballer, played for Partick Thistle, Torquay United and Scotland
 Hugh Brown (footballer, born 1940), Scottish footballer, played for Kilmarnock, Dumbarton and Scotland under-23

Others
 Hugh Stowell Brown (1823–1886), Christian minister and preacher
 Hugh D. Brown (fl. 1887–1893), Irish Association Baptist author, pastor-teacher, politician and President of the Irish Baptist Association
 Hugh Auchincloss Brown (1879–1975), electrical engineer best known for advancing a theory of catastrophic pole shift
 Hugh B. Brown (1883–1975), American and Canadian attorney, educator, and Latter-day Saint leader
 Hugh Brown (politician) (1919–2008), Scottish Member of Parliament
 Hugh Ned Brown (1919–2011), American fund-raising consultant
 U Brown (Huford Brown, born 1956), Jamaican reggae deejay and producer